Lithium tert-butoxide is the metalloorganic compound with the formula LiOC(CH3)3.  A white solid, it is used as a strong base in organic synthesis.  The compound is often depicted as a salt, and it often behaves as such, but it is not ionized in solution. Both octameric and hexameric forms have been characterized by X-ray crystallography

Preparation

Lithium tert-butoxide is commercially available as a solution and as a solid, but it is often generated in situ for laboratory use because samples are so sensitive and older samples are often of poor quality.  It can be obtained by treating tert-butanol with butyl lithium.

Reactions
As a strong base, lithium tert-butoxide is easily protonated.

Lithium tert-butoxide is used to prepare other tert-butoxide compounds such as copper(I) t-butoxide and hexa(tert-butoxy)dimolybdenum(III):
2 MoCl3(thf)3  +  6 LiOBu-t  →  Mo2(OBu-t)6  +  6 LiCl  +  6 thf

Related compounds
Sodium tert-butoxide
Potassium tert-butoxide

References

Alkoxides
Lithium compounds
Non-nucleophilic bases
Organolithium compounds
Reagents for organic chemistry
Tert-butyl compounds